Alias Mary Dow is a 1935 American drama film directed by Kurt Neumann and starring Sally Eilers, Ray Milland and Henry O'Neill.

The film's sets were designed by the art director Ralph Berger.

Premise
In order to comfort his dying wife, a man hires a taxi-dancer to pose as their daughter who had been kidnapped as a child. However, when the woman unexpectedly recovers she is forced to maintain the deception.

Cast
 Sally Eilers as Sally Gates  
 Ray Milland as Peter Marshall  
 Henry O'Neill as Henry Dow 
 Katharine Alexander as Evelyn Dow  
 Chick Chandler as Jimmie Kane  
 Addison Richards as Martin  
 Lola Lane as Minnie  
 Clarence Muse as 'Rufe' 
 Juanita Quigley as Mary Dow

References

Bibliography
 Quinlan, David. The Film Lover's Companion: An A to Z Guide to 2,000 Stars and the Movies They Made. Carol Publishing Group, 1997.

External links
 

1935 films
1935 drama films
American drama films
Films directed by Kurt Neumann
Films scored by Oliver Wallace
Universal Pictures films
American black-and-white films
1930s English-language films
1930s American films